Ah-Tah-Thi-Ki is a museum of Seminole culture and history, located on the Big Cypress Indian Reservation in Hendry County, Florida. The museum is owned and operated by the Seminole Tribe of Florida. The museum itself was named in a Seminole language phrase: Ah-Tah-Thi-Ki, which means "a place to learn, a place to remember". 

The museum opened in 1997. It has been designated a Smithsonian Institution Affiliate. The Museum was accredited by the American Association of Museums in 2009 and it was the first tribally owned museum to receive this title.

Archives 
The Ah-Tah-Thi-Ki Seminole Indian Museum Oral History Program preserves Seminole history, memory, and culture by recording the spoken word. The oral history collection includes interviews conducted in Miccosukee and Creek language.

These interviews can be translated into English but only when it is approved and accepted by the Seminole Tribal members. This collection is made up of a variety of VHS, DVD, CD, audio cassette tapes, DAT tapes, reel to reel, BETA, and other types of media documentation.

The museum maintains the Seminole Indian Library and Archives in order to preserve and make accessible Seminole and Native American history for use by scholars and the general public. Holdings include:

 government documents dating from the early 1800s to mid- 1900s covering 60 Native American tribes; within these documents, there is information regarding the interactions between the United States government and different Native tribes
 a newspaper collection that includes information relating to the Indian removal, Seminole wars, and the relationships between the Indians and whites
 The Ethel Cutler Freeman Collection which was a mixture of photographs, travel diaries, and manuscripts that ranged from 1939 to 1967
 The Boehmer Photographs Collection
 The Brown Family Letters Collection: letters that were written by two individuals who lived during the Seminole wars and described their experience with it
 and various tribal memorabilia including objects that represent activities and events from the Seminole Tribe of Florida

The library of the Ah-Tah-Thi-Ki Seminole Museum has 375 linear feet of shelves. Individuals, including researchers, can use these items in the library but they can not be borrowed or accessed outside of the library's domain.

Conservation program

The Seminole museum has a conservation program. The purpose of the conservation program is to examine, document, and treat any artifact that belongs to the Seminole heritage and culture. The conservation efforts are a process that requires lots of consideration and care, and these efforts want to ensure that the artifact will remain intact for as long as possible, while still being integrated into the Ah-Tah-Thi-Ki museum as a useful resource.

Collection 
The museum contains an online collection database. Through this database, one can have remote access to a variety of documents including archives and random images related to the Seminole Tribe and other tribes.

Education division of the Ah-Tah-Thi-Ki Seminole Museum 
The Seminole Museum has an Education Division. The museum offers a range number of curricula programming that helps Seminole Trial members and non-tribal members learn about and engage with Seminole stories, history, and culture. This specific division includes tours and programs that support students (and other interested individuals) in learning and understanding the Seminole peoples' culture and history. The division is not just limited to onsite tours and programs- it also has online accessible educational resources that teachers and students in the classroom can utilize.

History 
The Ah-Tah-Thi-Ki Museum was finished in the year 1989, but it was not until August 21, 1997, that people were able to visit the museum. This opening day was a special day because it helped commemorate the 40th anniversary of the federal recognition of the Seminole Tribe of Florida. The Museum has undergone different renovations and directors since its opening. In 2005, the museum added a small satellite location within the Seminole Paradise area of Seminole Hard Rock Hotel and Casino in Hollywood- this location was then closed in 2009. One of the first Executive Directors of the museum was Billy L. Cypress. Mr. Cypress was a member of the Seminole Tribe of Florida and of the Bear Clan. He was also a US Army veteran and college graduate with an English master's degree and post-graduate work in History. Mr. Billy L. Cypress passed away in 2004, and the next director was Tina M. Osceola who was in that position until June 2011. The most current Executive Director of the museum is Gordon 'Ollie" Wareham- the nephew of the late Billy L. Cypress. The efforts of these individuals and the changes throughout the museum have helped the cultural institution prosper.

Seminole Tribe of Florida 

The Seminole Tribe of Florida maintains the museum.

Seminole people were established in Florida by the 18th century, but after many conflicts and wars, they were forced to relocate away from Florida. These relocated groups became two individual groups, which are the Seminole Nation of Oklahoma and the Miccosukee Tribe of Indians of Florida. A small group of about 300-700 Seminole people resisted the relocation and remained in Florida. This small group of Seminole people continued with their ancestral legacy by practicing their cultural traditions and relying on matriarchal clans, and after much anticipation, in 1957, the Seminole Tribe was finally recognized federally as the Seminole Tribe of Florida.

When the Spanish arrived in Florida, they met the Miccosukee people, which were the ancestors of the Seminole Tribe. Initially, the Seminole tribe continued with their way of living by trading (with other tribes and colonists) and practicing their traditions, but eventually, the United States would start encroaching onto their land, igniting the first disputes between Native people and the settlers. When Andrew Jackson became the seventh president, he signed into law a policy that would force all Indians that were living East of the Mississippi river to move West. The Native people tried to fight for their homes, and many were forced to move, but a few people followed a Native leader: Abiaki. Abiaki, who was also known as Sam Jones, was a Mikasuki tribe member. He was a medicine man and his care and guidance for his tribe earned him respect and recognition from others. The American soldiers nicknamed Abiaki "The Devil" because he was a great leader, strategist, and spy along with being a healer (medicine man).  Abiaki avoided negotiation with the Americans because he strongly opposed the relocation of his people away from their land. After the wars and a great loss of native people, Abiaki led the remaining two hundred Seminole Indians into the deep wetlands of Florida. This native group survived the persecution that was occurring at that time, and today, they strive as their own community with more than five thousand tribal members. These movements led way to the creation of the Ah-Tah-Thi-Ki Seminole Museum which today continues to keep Seminole traditions and history alive for others.

References

External links 
 

Museums in Hendry County, Florida
Seminole culture
Smithsonian Institution affiliates
Native American museums in Florida
History museums in Florida
Florida Native American Heritage Trail
Museums established in 1997
1997 establishments in Florida
Seminole Tribe of Florida